The 2017–18 Macedonian Third Football League was the 26th season of the third-tier football league in the Republic of Macedonia, since its establishment.

North

Teams

Table

Center

Teams

Table

Southeast

Teams

Table

East

Teams

Table

West

Teams

Table

Southwest

Teams

Table

See also 
 2017–18 Macedonian Football Cup
 2017–18 Macedonian First Football League
 2017–18 Macedonian Second Football League

References 

Macedonian Third Football League seasons
Macedonia 3
3